Tutnall and Cobley is a civil parish in the Bromsgrove District of Worcestershire, England.  It has a population of 1,543. The villages of Tutnall and Tardebigge are within the parish; the Cobley part of the parish name may refer to Cobley Hill.

References

External links
 Bromsgrove District Council Parish Website

Civil parishes in Worcestershire